Maurice Stanley Cockerill (born 8 December 1928) is a former New Zealand rugby union player. A fullback, Cockerill represented  at a provincial level, and was a member of the New Zealand national side, the All Blacks, in 1951. He played 11 matches for the All Blacks including three internationals, but a serious knee injury suffered while playing for Taranaki in a game against Waikato later in 1951 ended his rugby career.

He was educated at Hawera Technical College, where he was a member of the 1st XV between 1943 and 1946.

Cockerill is also a former Taranaki cricket representative.

References

1928 births
Living people
Rugby union players from Hāwera
New Zealand rugby union players
New Zealand international rugby union players
Taranaki rugby union players
Rugby union fullbacks
New Zealand cricketers